Margaret M. Mitchell (born 1956) is an American biblical scholar and professor of early Christianity. She is currently Shailer Mathews Distinguished Service Professor at the University of Chicago Divinity School. Mitchell received her doctorate at the same institution in 1989, under the supervision of Hans Dieter Betz and Robert McQueen Grant. She also served as dean of the Divinity School from 2010 to 2015.

Mitchell has made important contributions to research on the letters of the Apostle Paul, particularly on those to the Corinthians, on early Christian rhetoric, and on John Chrysostom. She has served on the editorial board of the Journal of Biblical Literature and New Testament Studies, and is currently the co-editor of a number of series, including the Novum Testamentum: Supplements series (Brill Publishers) and the Writings from the Greco-Roman World text and translation series (Society of Biblical Literature). Forthcoming projects include a commentary in the Hermeneia series on the Second Epistle to the Corinthians. She was awarded a Guggenheim fellowship in 2010.

Selected works

Thesis

Book

 . - revision of author's thesis.

Edited by

References

External links
 Mitchell's faculty page at the University of Chicago
 Mitchell's CV
 The Fish: A Conversation with Professor Mitchell and Dean Rosengarten: Their Thoughts on Faith, Love, Academia and Marriage

1956 births
American biblical scholars
Female biblical scholars
Living people
New Testament scholars
Place of birth missing (living people)
University of Chicago alumni
University of Chicago Divinity School faculty